Victoria-Kayen Woo (born 15 October 1997 in LaSalle, Quebec) is a Canadian artistic gymnast. She is the 2015 Pan American Games bronze medalist on balance beam and silver medalist with the team. She finished fourth with her team at the 2014 Commonwealth Games, and she competed at the 2014 World Championships and  2015 World Championships.

Personal life 
Victoria-Kayen Woo was born in LaSalle, Quebec to parents Billy Woo and Maryse Ronda. She has a younger sister, Rose-Kaying Woo, who is also a member of the Canadian National Gymnastics Team. She began gymnastics at age three, and her favorite gymnast is Aliya Mustafina.

Career

2014 
Woo competed at the 2014 Commonwealth Games after being brought in to replace Victoria Moors. The team finished in fourth behind England, Australia, and Wales. She competed at the 2014 World Championships where she helped the Canadian team finish in twelfth and qualify for the 2015 World Championships.

2015 
Woo competed at the 2015 Pan American Games in Toronto. The team won a silver medal behind the United States. She won the bronze medal on beam with teammate Ellie Black winning gold and American Megan Skaggs winning silver. After the competition Woo stated, "I was already surprised to qualify for the final on beam, because this apparatus is a little pet peeve of mine. It already felt like a gift to be there, so to win a medal was really the best reward!"

2019
In June Woo was named to the team to compete at the 2019 Pan American Games alongside Ana Padurariu (later replaced by Isabela Onyshko), Brooklyn Moors, Shallon Olsen, and Ellie Black.  Together they won the silver medal in the team final behind the United States.  On September 4 Woo was named to the team to compete at the 2019 World Championships in Stuttgart, Germany alongside Ana Padurariu, Shallon Olsen, Brooklyn Moors, and Ellie Black.

Competitive history

References

External links
 
 

1997 births
Canadian female artistic gymnasts
Gymnasts from Montreal
Living people
People from LaSalle, Quebec
People from Brossard
Commonwealth Games competitors for Canada
Gymnasts at the 2014 Commonwealth Games
Gymnasts at the 2015 Pan American Games
Gymnasts at the 2019 Pan American Games
Pan American Games silver medalists for Canada
Pan American Games bronze medalists for Canada
Pan American Games medalists in gymnastics
Medalists at the 2019 Pan American Games
Medalists at the 2015 Pan American Games
20th-century Canadian women
21st-century Canadian women